KDKO 89.5 FM is a Community radio station, owned and operated by the Native American Community Board, Inc. Licensed to Lake Andes, South Dakota, the station serves the Yankton Indian Reservation.

See also
List of community radio stations in the United States

References

External links
KDKO's webpage
The Native American Community Board's website

Community radio stations in the United States
Native American radio
DKO
Dakota culture
Yankton Dakota